Blepharocerus rubescens is a species of snout moth in the genus Blepharocerus. It was described by William James Kaye in 1925, and is known from Trinidad.

References

Chrysauginae
Moths described in 1925